In algebra, Quillen's Q-construction associates to an exact category (e.g., an abelian category) an algebraic K-theory. (The notation "+" is meant to suggest the construction adds more to the classifying space BC.) One puts

and call it the i-th K-group of C. Similarly, the i-th K-group of C with coefficients in a group G is defined as the homotopy group with coefficients:
.

The construction is widely applicable and is used to define an algebraic K-theory in a non-classical context.

Waldhausen's S-construction generalizes the Q-construction in a stable sense; in fact, the former, which uses a more general Waldhausen category, produces a spectrum instead of a space. Grayson's binary complex also gives a construction of algebraic K-theory for exact categories. See also module spectrum#K-theory for a K-theory of a ring spectrum.

The construction 
Let C be an exact category; i.e., an additive full subcategory of an abelian category that is closed under extension. If there is an exact sequence  in C, then the arrow from M′ is called an admissible mono and the arrow from M is called an admissible epi.

Let QC be the category whose objects are the same as those of C and morphisms from X to Y are isomorphism classes of diagrams  such that the first arrow is an admissible epi and the second admissible mono and two diagrams are isomorphic if they differ only at the middle and there is an isomorphism between them. The composition of morphisms is given by pullback.

As it turns out, it is uniquely defined up to homotopy equivalence (so the notation is justified.)

Operations 
Every ring homomorphism  induces  and thus  where  is the category of finitely generated projective modules over R. One can easily show this map (called transfer) agrees with one defined in Milnor's Introduction to algebraic K-theory. The construction is also compatible with the suspension of a ring (cf. Grayson).

Comparison with the classical K-theory of a ring

The usual proof of the theorem (cf. ) relies on an intermediate homotopy equivalence. If S is a symmetric monoidal category in which every morphism is an isomorphism, one constructs (cf. Grayson) the category  that generalizes the Grothendieck group construction of a monoid. Let C be an exact category in which every exact sequence splits, e.g., the category of finitely generated projective modules, and put , the subcategory of C with the same class of objects but with morphisms that are isomorphisms in C. Then there is a "natural" homotopy equivalence:

.

The equivalence is constructed as follows. Let E be the category whose objects are short exact sequences in C and whose morphisms are isomorphism classes of diagrams between them. Let  be the functor that sends a short exact sequence to the third term in the sequence.

First of all, by definition, . Next,  gives us:

.

(Here,  is either the classifying space of the category  or the Eilenberg–MacLane space of the type , amounting to the same thing.)

Let  be the component containing R. Then, by a theorem of Quillen,

Thus, a class on the left is of the form . Hence,

Since  is an H-group,

Writing  for the homotopy fiber, we have the long exact sequence:

From homotopy theory, we know the second term is central; i.e.,  is a central extension.

Proof: The homotopy type of  does not change if we replace f by the pullback  along the universal covering of Y .

By the comparison theorem for spectral sequences, it follows that ; i.e.,  is acyclic. (Coincidentally, by reversing argument, one can say this implies  thus, the hypothesis of the lemma.) Next, the spectral sequence for the covering  with group  says:

An inspection of this spectral sequence gives the desired result.

References

Daniel Grayson, Higher algebraic K-theory II [after Daniel Quillen], 1976

Algebraic K-theory